Laurence Rochon "Laurie" Owen (May 9, 1944 – February 15, 1961) was a Hall of Fame American figure skater. She was the 1961 U.S. National Champion and represented the United States at the 1960 Winter Olympics, where she placed 6th. She was the daughter of Maribel Vinson and Guy Owen and the sister of Maribel Owen. Owen died, along with her mother, sister and the entire United States Figure Skating team, in the crash of Sabena Flight 548 en route to the 1961 World Figure Skating Championships.

Life and career
Owen was born in Oakland, California, and for the first eight years grew up in Berkeley. She was the second child of Guy Owen and Maribel Vinson, both talented figure skaters, and the younger sister of pairs skater Maribel Owen. In 1952, shortly after the death of her husband, Maribel Vinson moved her family back to her girlhood home at 195 High Street in Winchester, Massachusetts, where they lived with Maribel's mother. Laurence, who at school was known by her full name, attended Winchester Junior High School and then Winchester High School where in addition to maintaining her grueling training schedule she was an honor student, wrote poetry, and participated in several sports.

In 1956, Owen won the Eastern Junior Ladies title but was unable to participate in the United States Championships that year because of a broken wrist. In 1958, she placed 3rd in the United States Figure Skating Championship Junior Ladies Division and, in 1959, won the United States Figure Skating Championship Junior Ladies Division.
    
In January 1960, Owen placed 3rd in the 1960 United States Figure Skating Championships and qualified for the 1960 Winter Olympics where she placed 6th. Her mother, the 1932 Winter Olympics Bronze Medalist and nine times US Singles Champion Maribel Vinson-Owen, was her coach. 
    
On January 29, 1961, Owen won the 1961 United States Figure Skating Championships in Colorado Springs and on February 12 that same year, won the 1961 North American Figure Skating Championships in Philadelphia. After her victory at the US Nationals, she became a media sensation and was nicknamed "The Winchester Pixie." On February 13, 1961 she appeared on the cover of Sports Illustrated magazine with a feature story that described her as "America's most exciting girl skater." In that same Sports Illustrated issue, writer Barbara Hellman noted that Owen had both great presence and a dancer's ability to relate to her music and described her free skating as having "an air, a style, an individuality which sets it apart from all the work done in free skating in recent years."

On January 28, 2011 Owen was inducted into the United States Figure Skating Hall of Fame along with the entire 1961 World Team. Her sister Maribel Owen also was inducted and her mother Maribel Vinson-Owen was inducted for a third time in 2011, in her capacity as a 1961 World Team Coach. Previously, her mother had been inducted in the inaugural Class of 1976 as a singles skater and for a second time in 1994 as a pairs skater.

On February 17, 2011 the U.S. Figure Skating Association released the documentary film entitled "Rise 1961". The movie chronicled the relationship between Owen and her mother, the airliner crash in Belgium and the rebirth of the United States Figure Skating Team after the crash.

Death

As national champion, Owen was selected as a member of the U.S. Figure Skating Team to compete in the 1961 World Figure Skating Championships, to be held in Prague, Czechoslovakia. The championships were scheduled to begin on February 22, 1961. Just before 7:30 pm EST, on Valentine's Day 1961, Owen, her mother Maribel Vinson-Owen, her sister Maribel and the rest of the US team, along with 16 of the team's friends, family and coaches, boarded Sabena Flight 548 at Idlewild Airport in New York. On February 15, 1961, about 10:00 am Brussels time, the Boeing 707 approached Zaventem Airport. The aircraft was on a long approach to runway 20 when, near the runway threshold and at a height of 900 feet, power was increased and the landing gear retracted. The airplane attempted to circle and land on another runway but never made it back to the airport. The plane made three 360-degree turns to the left, during which the bank angle increased more and more until the aircraft had climbed to 1500 feet and was in a near vertical attitude. The 707 then leveled wings, abruptly pitched up, lost speed, and started to spiral rapidly, nose down, towards the ground. It crashed and caught fire in a marshy area adjacent to a farm field less than two miles from the airport at 10:04 a.m. Brussels time. All 72 people on board, as well as a farmer on the ground, were killed. Rescue workers discovered a signed copy of the Sports Illustrated magazine, featuring Owen with her signature pixie cut and a bright red skating dress on the cover, amid the wreckage. Laurence Owen was only 16 years old.

The World Championships that year were cancelled out of respect for the United States team.

A memorial service was held on February 26, and Owen was interred that day beside her mother and sister in Mount Auburn Cemetery in Cambridge, Massachusetts.

Epilogue

In her book on figure skating, Debbi Wilkes, a Canadian Hall of Fame skater and coach who watched Owen win her title, wrote:
"Laurence was wonderful. She had a fresh, wholesome look, but didn't fit into any mold. She was carefree and joyous on the ice. She had wonderful rosy cheeks, beautiful big eyes and a short shag haircut that feathered over her face and fluttered when she skated. I was totally enchanted by her."

Owen had planned to attend her mother's alma mater, Radcliffe College, with a view to eventually becoming a writer. Following her death, at her high school in Winchester, Massachusetts, Laurie Owen's English teacher read a poem to her classmates that Laurie had recently written. The poem ended with these words:

Gloom is but a shadow of the night, long past;
Hope is the light, 
The radiance.

Results

See also
 Maribel Vinson
 Maribel Owen
 Guy Owen
 Sabena Flight 548
 Sports Illustrated cover jinx

References

Footnotes

External links
 U.S. Figure Skating biography
 Remembering Flight 548: Shattered dreams
 February 13, 1961 Sports Illustrated Cover

American female single skaters
Figure skaters at the 1960 Winter Olympics
1944 births
1961 deaths
Victims of aviation accidents or incidents in Belgium
Olympic figure skaters of the United States
Sportspeople from Berkeley, California
People from Winchester, Massachusetts
Burials at Mount Auburn Cemetery
Sportspeople from Middlesex County, Massachusetts
American sportspeople of Canadian descent
Victims of aviation accidents or incidents in 1961
20th-century American women
20th-century American people